The 2023 D'Youville Saints men's volleyball team represents D'Youville University in the 2023 NCAA Division I & II men's volleyball season. The Saints (formerly the Spartans) are led by fourth year head coach Chris Krueger and play their home games at College Center Gymnasium. The Saints compete as a member of the newly created Northeast Conference men's volleyball conference and were picked to finish eighth in the NEC.

Season highlights
Will be filled in as the season progresses.

Roster

Schedule
TV/Internet Streaming information:
All home games will be streamed on ECC Sports Network (ECC SN). Most road games will be streamed by the schools streaming service, including NEC Front Row.

 *-Indicates conference match.
 Times listed are Eastern Time Zone.

Announcers for televised games
Princeton: Trevor Butts
Charleston (WV): Jack Withrow
American International: 
Central State: 
Daemen: 
Sacred Heart: 
Merrimack: 
Daemen: 
St. Francis Brooklyn: 
Alderson Broaddus: 
LIU: 
American International: 
American International: 
Elmira: 
St. Francis: 
Fairleigh Dickinson: 
St. Francis Brooklyn: 
LIU: 
Merrimack: 
Sacred Heart: 
St. Francis: 
Fairleigh Dickinson:

References

2023 in sports in New York (state)
D'Youville
D'Youville